Karl Frimann Dahl (19 September 1868  – 1953) was a Norwegian judge.

He was born in Christiania to Nils Astrup Dahl and Johanne Marie Hambro. He graduated as cand.jur. in 1888, and was named as a Supreme Court Justice from 1918 to 1938.

References

1868 births
1953 deaths
Judges from Oslo
Supreme Court of Norway justices